Camberwell North was a borough constituency located in the Metropolitan Borough of Camberwell, in South London.  It returned one Member of Parliament (MP) to the House of Commons of the Parliament of the United Kingdom.
The constituency was created for the 1885 general election, and abolished for the 1950 general election.

Boundaries

1918–1950: The Metropolitan Borough of Camberwell wards of Coburg, Marlborough, North Peckham and St George's.

Members of Parliament

Election results

Elections in the 1880s

Election in the 1890s

Elections in the 1900s

Elections in the 1910s

General Election 1914–15:

Another General Election was required to take place before the end of 1915. The political parties had been making preparations for an election to take place and by the July 1914, the following candidates had been selected; 
Liberal: Thomas Macnamara
Unionist: Walter Radford

In 1918 constituency boundaries were changed and a new seat of Camberwell North West was created. Macnamara chose to contest the new seat.

Elections in the 1920s

Election in the 1930s

General Election 1939–40

Another General Election was required to take place before the end of 1940. The political parties had been making preparations for an election to take place and by the Autumn of 1939, the following candidates had been selected; 
Labour: Charles Ammon
Conservative: Edward Rudolph Mayer

Election in the 1940s

References

 
 British Parliamentary Election Results 1885-1918, compiled and edited by F.W.S. Craig (Macmillan Press 1974)
 Debrett’s Illustrated Heraldic and Biographical House of Commons and the Judicial Bench 1886
 Debrett’s House of Commons and the Judicial Bench 1901
 Debrett’s House of Commons and the Judicial Bench 1918

Parliamentary constituencies in London (historic)
Constituencies of the Parliament of the United Kingdom established in 1885
Constituencies of the Parliament of the United Kingdom disestablished in 1950
Politics of the London Borough of Southwark
Camberwell